Henderson Creek is a  tributary of the Mississippi River, which it joins in Henderson County, Illinois, near the villages of Gladstone and Oquawka.

Henderson Creek rises in Knox County northwest of Wataga and flows west. South Henderson Creek joins the stream in eastern Warren County, and Middle Henderson Creek joins farther west in Warren County. The creek continues west, entering Henderson County, where it receives North Henderson Creek and Cedar Creek.

Cities, towns and counties
The following cities, towns and villages are drained by Henderson Creek:
Alexis
Biggsville
Galesburg
Gladstone
Henderson
Kirkwood
Little York
Monmouth
North Henderson
Rio
Seaton

The following counties are at least partly in the Henderson Creek basin:
Henderson
Knox
Mercer
Warren

Parks and entry points
Big River State Forest near Oquawka
Oquawka State Wildlife Refuge

See also
List of Illinois rivers

References

External links
Prairie Rivers
USGS real-time Stream Gage, Henderson Creek at Oquakwa
USEPA TMDL's Henderson Creek

Rivers of Illinois
Tributaries of the Mississippi River
Rivers of Henderson County, Illinois
Rivers of Knox County, Illinois
Rivers of Warren County, Illinois
Rivers of Mercer County, Illinois